Meilen–Rorenhaab is one of the 111 serial sites of the UNESCO World Heritage Site Prehistoric pile dwellings around the Alps, of which 56 are located in Switzerland.

Geography 

The site is located on Lake Zurich {Zürichsee) lakeshore in Rohrenhaab, a locality of the municipality of Meilen in the Canton of Zürich in Switzerland. The settlement comprises , and the buffer zone including the lake area comprises  in all. During the winter of 1853–54, in the context of lowered water levels at the lake, archaeologist Ferdinand Keller discovered the remains of the site.

Description 
As mentioned, this site was the starting point of pile-dwelling research and therefore interesting from the point of view of research history. It is one of several sites in a small area illustrating the typical settlement dynamics of a micro-region during the Neolithic. All periods are represented here, usually with several settlement phases, but particularly from the Early Bronze Age interesting are numerous dendrochronological dates, which allow to study the development of this period.

Protection 
As well as being part of the 56 Swiss sites of the UNESCO World Heritage Site Prehistoric pile dwellings around the Alps, the settlement is also listed in the Swiss inventory of cultural property of national and regional significance as a Class A object of national importance. Hence, the area is provided as a historical site under federal protection, within the meaning of the Swiss Federal Act on the nature and cultural heritage (German: Bundesgesetz über den Natur- und Heimatschutz NHG) of 1 July 1966. Unauthorised researching and purposeful gathering of findings represent a criminal offense according to Art. 24.

See also 
 Prehistoric pile dwellings around Zürichsee

Literature 
 Peter J. Suter, Helmut Schlichtherle et al.: Pfahlbauten – Palafittes – Palafitte. Palafittes, Biel 2009. .
 Beat Eberschweiler: Ur- und frühgeschichtliche Verkehrswege über den Zürichsee: Erste Ergebnisse aus den Taucharchäologischen Untersuchungen beim Seedamm. In: Mitteilungen des Historischen Vereins des Kantons Schwyz, Volume 96, Schwyz 2004.

References

External links 

 

Prehistoric pile dwellings in Switzerland
Meilen
Lake Zurich
Cultural property of national significance in the canton of Zürich
Archaeological sites in Switzerland